"Guitar Polka" is a 1946 instrumental song by Al Dexter and His Troopers.  "Guitar Polka" spent sixteen weeks at number one on the Juke Box Folk charts and a total of twenty-nine weeks on the chart.

The B-side of the song entitled, "Honey Do You Think It's Wrong" peaked at number two, on the same chart.

References

1946 songs
Instrumentals
Polkas
Songs written by Al Dexter